Barlas is a common masculine Turkish given name. In Turkish, "Barlas" means "hero", "brave", "chivalrous" and/or "warrior". It is also the name of one of the -later Turkicized- Mongol confederations (Barlas) in Central Asia, which was the chief tribe of the Timurids.

Given name
 Barlas Erinç, Turkish musician, rock singer and songwriter

See also

 Barlas (surname)

Turkish masculine given names